Wave Peak is a conspicuous peak, 960 m, which rises precipitously from the head of Laws Glacier in the central part of Coronation Island, in the South Orkney Islands. The feature has a prominent ridge running in a southwesterly direction. To the north and east it slopes gently to the level of Brisbane Heights. Surveyed in 1948-49 by the Falkland Islands Dependencies Survey (FIDS), and so named by them because of the resemblance of this peak to a wave about to break.

References

Coronation Island
Mountains of the South Orkney Islands